Dahana is a genus of moths in the family Erebidae erected by Augustus Radcliffe Grote in 1875.

Species
 Dahana atripennis Grote, 1875
 Dahana cubana Schaus, 1904

References

Ctenuchina
Moth genera